The year 1975 in architecture involved some significant architectural events and new buildings.

Events
 Planned residential development of Noak Bridge in the Borough of Basildon (England), designed by George Garrard and Maurice Naunton, begins.

Buildings and structures

Buildings opened

 June 10 – Fundació Joan Miró in Barcelona, designed by Josep Lluís Sert.
 June 25 – Addleshaw Tower at Chester Cathedral in England, designed by George Pace.
 June 28 – Sir Thomas White Building, St John's College, Oxford, England, designed by Philip Dowson of Arup Associates.
 c. September – Metropolitan Correctional Center, Chicago, designed by Harry Weese.
 October 10 – Afrikaans Language Monument, Paarl, South Africa.
 December 10 – General Artigas Bridge, Uruguay River, Uruguay.
 Worth Abbey church in West Sussex, England, designed by Francis Pollen, consecrated.
 Malmö Konsthall in Sweden, designed by Klas Anshelm.

Buildings completed

 Frank House, also known as House VI, designed by Peter Eisenman.
 First Canadian Place in Toronto, Ontario, Canada, the tallest building in Canada (1975-present).
 The Fernmeldeturm Mannheim in Mannheim, Germany.
 The Willis Building (Ipswich), England, designed by Foster Associates.
 Granite Tower in Billings, Montana, designed by Harrison Fagg's partnership.
 Modissa (fashion store) in Zürich, Switzerland, designed by Werner Gantenbein.
 Foire Internationale de Dakar in Senegal, designed by Jean-François Lamoureux and Jean-Louis Marin.
 Ramot Polin housing development in East Jerusalem, designed by Zvi Hecker.
 River Park Towers, The Bronx, designed by Davis, Brody & Associates
 Les Arcades du Lac and Le Viaduc housing development in Saint-Quentin-en-Yvelines, near Versailles, France, designed by Ricardo Bofill Taller de Arquitectura.
 Warszawa Centralna railway station in Poland (by 	Arseniusz Romanowicz).

Awards
 Architecture Firm Award – Davis, Brody & Associates
 Grand prix national de l'architecture – Jean Willerval
 RAIA Gold Medal – Sydney Ancher
 RIBA Royal Gold Medal – Michael Scott
 Twenty-five Year Award – Philip Johnson's Residence

Events
 Designated European Architectural Heritage Year by the Council of Europe.
 SAVE Britain's Heritage founded as a campaigning group for endangered buildings.

Births
 December 3 – Julien De Smedt, Belgian-Danish architect

Deaths

 June 2 – Robert Matthew, Scottish modernist architect (born 1906)
 June 5 – John Leopold Denman, English Neo-Georgian architect (born 1882)
 June 7 – Robert Schmertz, American folk musician and architect (born 1898)
 June 14 – Pablo Antonio, Filipino modernist architect (born 1901)
 July 9 – Edward D. Dart, American Mid-Century Modern architect (born 1922)
 August 23 – George Pace, English ecclesiastical architect (born 1915)
 August 28 – Norman Jewson, English Arts & Crafts architect (born 1884)
 September 21 – Mihran Mesrobian, Armenian American architect (born 1889)
 December 23 – Ejnar Mindedal Rasmussen, Danish Neoclassical architect (born 1892)
 December 29 – Sigurd Lewerentz, Swedish architect and furniture designer (born 1885)

References

 
20th-century architecture